David Darling may refer to:

David Darling (musician) (1941–2021), American cellist and composer
David J. Darling (born 1953), British science writer and astronomer
David Darling (entrepreneur), British co-founder of computer game producer Codemasters
Dave Darling, musician and record producer from Los Angeles